Kaolack is a town of 172,305 people (2002 census) on the north bank of the Saloum River and the N1 road in Senegal. It is the capital of the Kaolack Region, which borders The Gambia to the south. Kaolack is an important regional market town and is Senegal's main peanut trading and processing center. As the center of the Ibrahimiyya branch of the Tijaniyyah Sufi order founded by Ibrayima Ñas, it is also a major center of Islamic education. The Leona Niassene mosque (right) in Kaolack is one of the largest and best known in Senegal.

History
It is the successor city to Kahone, historic capital of the kingdom of Saloum. Kahone, originally a place marked by a sacred tree on the right bank of the Saloum River facing the island of Kouyong, became capital of the mostly Serer kingdom of Saloum in the early 16th century. In the 17th and 18th centuries it consisted of a number of distinct neighborhoods separated by open fields, each of which was under the jurisdiction of a different dignitary or official. One of these wards, Kaolack,  downriver, was founded by Sega and Massar, two brothers of fulani origin from Macina in today's Mali. Sega’s son, Alioune Mboutou Sow, later served as the Chef de Canton of Kaolack.

After a period of exile in British-controlled Gambia between 1901 and 1910, Abdoulaye Niass established his Zawiya in the Leona neighborhood of Kaolack. The community of followers of Ibrāhīm Niasse known as Jamāʿat al-fayḍa established a "Holy Town" borders of what is now known as Kaolack called "Medina-Baye" in 1930.
 
The Mboutou family house still stands in the middle of the town centre. Mboutou Sow's daughter Ramatoulaye (Rahmat'oullah) was given in marriage to the son of Ahmadou Bamamba Mbacke. Hence the saying Kaolack worrou Mboutou (kaoalck mboutou's fiefdom).

Serere arwe in fatick, kahone and other surrounding area. Though in good terms with the muslims the ceddo serere never settle in kaolack - 
Another, Maka Kahone, was inhabited by Muslims and administered by clerics. Otherwise, the population of the town practiced traditional religion and court ceremonies centered on the river bank, Kouyong Island, and various monumental baobab trees.

French interests in the Saloum River increased in the early 19th century as legitimate articles of trade were sought to replace trade in slaves. By mid-century, peanut production had been introduced to the kingdom of Saloum and, with the permission of its king, a fortified factory was established by the French on the riverfront at Kaolack.

Kaolack was more favorably placed for shipping than Kahone. The French laid out a first grid of lots in 1860, in what would become the city center, or "Escale" neighborhood. The construction of a rail spur from the port to the Dakar-Niger line in 1911 caused the town to boom as a peanut processing and export center. Its population grew rapidly, rising from 5,600 in 1925 to 44,000 in 1934.

It is at this time that Kaolack became an important center for the Tijaniyyah Sufi order, with a first major zâwiyah, or “lodge”, opening in Leona neighborhood in 1910 and a second one opening in Madina Baye in the early 1930s. The Tijaniyyah of Madina Baye is an international institution with disciples in many cities, including Kano, Nigeria, and Chicago, Illinois.

There is a peanut oil processing plant with its own port facilities in the downstream suburb of Lyndiane, while salt pans across the Saloum river constitute the city’s only other major industrial activity.

Climate
Kaolack has a hot semi-arid climate (Köppen climate classification: BSh), with a short rainy season and a lengthy dry season.

Neighbourhoods
Among Kaolack's many neighbourhoods are:

Lewna (Léona in French), which includes much of the city center. It includes Lewna Ñaseen (Léona Niassène in French), the headquarters of the branch of the Tijānī Islamic order founded in 1910 by  after his exile in Gambia. But now the Tijānī Islamic Order is held by the eldest son of Mame Khalifa who also was the oldest son of Allaji Abdoulaye Niass .
Jaleñ (Dialègne in French), between Lewna Ñaseen and Medina Mbàbba.
Medina Mbàbba (Médina Mbaba in French), also called "Medina I", named after Baabakar Njaay, nicknamed "Mbàbba Njaay," who was the Serer chief of the village when it was incorporated into Kaolack.
Medina Baay (Médina Baye in French), also called "Medina II", on the northeast edge of the city. It is the center of the Ibrāhīmiiya branch of the Tijānī order founded in 1930 by Allaaji Abdulaay Ñas's son, Ibrayima Ñas, known to his followers as "Baay" ("Father" in Wolof). The name in Arabic means "The City of Baay."  
Saam (Sam in French), west of Medina Baay in the north of Kaolack, also founded by Ibrayima Ñas. Saam was originally designated as the fields and orchards of Ibrayima Ñas's disciples, but since the 1970s the trees have been replaced by houses.
 Ndoorong (Ndorong in French), west of Saam, founded by Bashiru Mbàkke and his Murid disciples.
 Coofog (Thiofoke in French), north of Saam, which existed before Kaolack as a Serer village ruled by the Guelowar dynasty.

International relations

Twin towns — Sister cities
Kaolack is twinned with:
  Aosta, Italy 
  Mérignac, France
  Memphis, United States

See also 
 Railway stations in Senegal

References

External links 

 Peace Corps Senegal, Kaolack Page

Populated places in Kaolack Region
Kaolack Region
Regional capitals in Senegal
French West Africa
Communes of Senegal